Canada participated in the ninth Winter Paralympics in Turin, Italy. Heading the delegation was the Chef de Mission, Marg McGregor. The country's flag bearer at the opening ceremony was Todd Nicholson, captain of the ice sledge hockey team.

Canada entered 35 athletes in the following sports:

Alpine skiing: 7 male, 3 female
Ice sledge hockey: 15 male
Nordic skiing: 3 male, 2 female
Wheelchair curling: 3 male, 2 female

Medalists

See also
2006 Winter Paralympics
Canada at the 2006 Winter Olympics

References

External links
Torino 2006 Paralympic Games (link dead)
International Paralympic Committee
 Canadian Paralympic Committee

2006
Nations at the 2006 Winter Paralympics
Paralympics